Milčinski is a surname. Notable people with the surname include:

Fran Milčinski (1867–1932), Slovenian lawyer, writer and playwright
Frane Milčinski (1914–1988), Slovenian poet, satirist, humorist, comedian, actor, writer and director
Jana Milčinski (1920–2007), Slovenian writer, journalist and translator
Juš Milčinski, Slovenian actor